Kongara Kalan is a village in Ranga Reddy district in Telangana, India. It falls under Ibrahimpatnam mandal. It has population of 5,269 as per the 2011 Census of India.

References

Villages in Ranga Reddy district